Criteria: A Critical Review of the Arts was a Canadian feminist art periodical published by the Criteria Arts Society in Vancouver, BC from June 1974 until Fall 1978.

Content 

The magazine has been described as:"A well-established critical review of the arts, Criteria offers articles and essays on topics of concern to artists and the art community as a whole. Recent issues have included lengthy articles on women artists and the Canadian art world, and on performance and video art. In tabloid format, but printed on heavy paper, this title is highly recommended."The magazine's content included "interviews with Robert Frank, Hermann Nitsch, Michael Snow, Dennis Wheeler, Joyce Wieland, as well as discussions of work by Jack Chambers and Judy Chicago, articles by Henry Lehman and Tom Sherman, and artist projects by Ian Wallace and Lawrence Weiner.

Criteria also published pieces on Canadian art criticism and feminist critiques of representation, as well as articles on funding arts and culture.

References 

Magazines established in 1974